Tahir Sultan Shamsi (18 February 1962 – 21 December 2021) was a Pakistani professor of medicine, researcher and pioneer of Bone marrow transplant in Pakistan worked as a clinical hematologist and bone marrow transplant physician. He established the National Institute for Blood Diseases (NIBD).  He was the director of the Stem Cell Programme at NIBD as well.

Life and career
Shamsi was born on 18 February 1962. At the age of eight, he memorized the Quran. He graduated from Dow Medical College in 1988 and received a postgraduate degree from the Royal College of Pathologists. He died from a stroke on 21 December 2021, at the age of 59.

Achievements
A pioneer of bone marrow transplants in Pakistan, the doctor performed the first transplant in the country in 1995 after returning from the United Kingdom. Shamsi is credited with introducing bone-marrow transplants in Pakistan in 1996. So far, he performed 650 bone-marrow transplants and wrote over 100 research articles.

Awards and honors
 Fellow of the Royal College of Physicians
 Lifetime achievement award by The Dow Graduates Association of North America (2016)

Publications

References

1962 births
2021 deaths
Dow Medical College alumni
Fellows of the Royal College of Physicians
Pakistani medical doctors